The Bhambi are a Hindu caste. Those from Gujarat are Chamar. Those found in the state of Maharashtra and Punjab in India. Bhambi's from Punjab region are Saraswat Brahmin

See also

 Brahmin
 Chamar

References

Social groups of Maharashtra
Indian castes
Dalit communities